Alois Bernhard "Alec" Eisenträger (16 July 1927 – 10 August 2017) was a German footballer who played as an inside forward.

Career

Eisenträger was made a POW aged 16 after being captured on a Dutch airfield and spent the rest of the war at a POW camp near Trowbridge, England. He started playing for Trowbridge Town and then in 1949 moved to Bristol City, scoring four goals against Newport County in September of that year. Thus, he was part of a professional British football team even before the famous Bert Trautmann moved to Manchester City. He gained promotion with the Robins to the Second Division in 1955. Until he left for Merthyr Tydfil in 1958 he had appeared in 246 games for Bristol City, netting 57 times. In 1959, Eisenträger signed for Chelmsford City, making his debut in a 2–2 home draw against Worcester City on 22 August 1959, becoming the joint 250th player to represent the club.

Personal life

He married a woman from Wales in the early 1950s and had four children.

References

Further reading

German footballers
Association football inside forwards
English Football League players
Bristol City F.C. players
Merthyr Tydfil F.C. players
German prisoners of war in World War II held by the United Kingdom
German expatriate sportspeople in Wales
German expatriate sportspeople in England
Herne Bay F.C. players
Footballers from Hamburg
Trowbridge Town F.C. players
Chelmsford City F.C. players
1927 births
2017 deaths